Madison Blaine McLaughlin (born November 5, 1995) is an American actress. She is known for playing Evelyn Sharp/Artemis on the CW superhero television series Arrow.

McLaughlin serves as the vice president of the MacPac Foundation, a non-profit that raises awareness, funds, and, support for research and families affected by hypomyelination with brainstem and spinal cord involvement and leg spasticity (HBSL), a rare genetic leukodystrophy.

Early life
Madison Blaine McLaughlin lived in Louisiana before moving to Los Angeles with her family when she was 11. She has three younger sisters: Marissa, Mallory, and Mahrynn.

Career 
McLaughlin's first notable role was as a guest star on the TV show Supernatural. She has had multiple appearances on the show. In 2013, she also starred in Season 3 of Teen Wolf as Paige Krasikeva.

She's made recurring appearances on the TV show Major Crimes and Chicago P.D.

In 2016, McLaughlin's was cast in the superhero TV series Arrow to play the role of Evelyn Sharp, her biggest role to date.

In 2020, McLaughlin starred in Lifetime Network's teen thriller Most Likely to Murder and also appeared in a guest role on CW's Roswell, New Mexico.

Filmography

References

External links 
 

1995 births
Living people
21st-century American actresses
Actresses from Los Angeles
Actresses from Louisiana
American child actresses
American television actresses